Allah Morad may refer to:
Allah Morad, Chaharmahal and Bakhtiari
Allah Morad, Kermanshah